The first season of The Switch Drag Race began airing on 8 October 2015 on the MEGA and WOW Presents Plus's WOW Presents Plus streaming service. It ran for twenty-four episodes.

The winner of first series of The Switch Drag Race was Luz Violeta, with Stephanie Fox and Luna di Mauri as the runner-up, and Jessica Parker being crowned first Mejor Compañera.

Challenges
Each episode, with the guidance of the four celebrity coaches, the contestants compete in the following challenges;

Artistic Challenge: In this first test, each contestant has to characterize a TV personality or pop culture icon either on themselves, another contestant, or a guest. This test is judged individually as well as in groups. Depending on the episode, one of two outcomes occur; 
Immunity from elimination is offered to the highest performer (of the winning group, if applicable) or a nominee is chosen to head directly to the Elimination Duel
Or the winning contestants (or team) progresses to the Imitation Challenge to compete for immunity, with the competitors who don't win continuing on to the Singing Challenge.
Imitation Challenge: In this second test, each contestant has to maintain the characterizations of their character/icon make-over from the previous challenge and add an element of acting, singing, dancing, or lip-sync performance. Immunity and nominations are chosen in the outcome of this challenge as well. In the first episode of Season 1, the weakest performer was eliminated from this challenge by majority vote from the judges.
Singing Challenge: In this third test, each individual contestant has to sing a song of their own choosing live in front of the judges and a studio audience. At the end of each presentation, each member of the judges panel assigns a point score ranging from 1 to 7, based on the quality of each contestant's performance. After the first score is given, the first contestant must sit in the "Elimination chair" until another performer replaces them by having a lower score than them. If the next performer receives a higher score than the person in the chair, they are safe from elimination and proceed backstage to prepare for the next episode. Ultimately, the contestant with the lowest score is nominated to go up for elimination in the Elimination Duel.
Elimination Duels: In this last test, the lowest scored performer in the episode's Singing Challenge is put up against the performer nominated from one of the other challenges. They both perform a live song of their choosing and the judges vote by majority who will be eliminated from The Switch. Typically, contestants that aren't competing that episode are shown watching the Elimination Duel backstage in the make-up room alongside singing coach Patricia Maldonado Aravena. In the event of a tie in the voting, Juan Pablo González acts as the president of the judges panel and casts a final vote for the elimination. The eliminated contestant is typically honored with a montage of their run on the show and is ultimately shown writing a farewell with a tube of lipstick on a mirror in the briefing room à la the American Drag Race.

Finale
Quarter-finals: The final ten contestants are split up to compete in two episodes (19 and 20). One immunity is given the winner of the Imitation Challenge in each episode, allowing them to progress to the Semi-finals episode. The other four contestants performing in a Singing Challenge with the judges announcing which two contestants will continue on to the Finale via majority vote. The two remaining contestants perform in an Elimination Duel to fight for the fourth spot in the two-part Finale episode.
Semi-finals: The eight contestants are again split up into groups of two to compete in two episodes (21 and 22), with one contestant being eliminated each episode. The contestants must all compete in an Imitation challenge and a Singing Challenge, with the judges all assigning point scores for each contestant overall. The contestant with the highest score in each episode automatically advance to compete as finalists. The contestant with the lowest score in both episodes are eliminated from the competition, with the two remaining contestants being safe. In the third episode (23) of the Semi-finals, the four previously safe contestants perform the challenges once more, with the highest scored performer advancing to the finale; the lowest scored performer being eliminated; and the two remaining "safe" performers being nominated to duel against each other in the final episode. For dramatic effect, one judge is chosen for each episode in the Semi-finals to withhold their scores for the contestants until the end of the episode, where it is revealed who gets to progress to the finale and who gets eliminated based on the final tally.
Secret Votes:
Episode 21: Nicole Gaultier
Episode 22: Juan Pablo González
Episode 23: Sebastián Errázuriz
Finale: The two previously nominated contestants from the third round of the Semi-finals go head-to-head in an Elimination Duel, with one contestant ultimately being eliminated from the competition and the other advancing as a finalist. Following this, the four finalists perform individually in a Singing Challenge one last time to determine the outcome of the competition. After eliminating the weakest performer by the judges' vote, the winner of The Switch is crowned the best "transformista", or drag entertainer, of Chile and the runners-up are named.

The winner of The Switch receives a grand prize of CLP$10,000,000 (approximately USD$15,700) and a one-year supply of products and accessories from AnyHair, a Spanish company by way of Chile that specializes in hair extensions, wigs, and hairpieces.

Contestants

Ages, names, and cities stated are at time of filming.

Notes

Contestant progress

Episodes

References

The Switch Drag Race
2015 in LGBT history
2016 in LGBT history
2015 in Chilean television
2016 in Chilean television
2015 television seasons
2016 television seasons
Switch